"The Maestro" is an episode of the NBC sitcom Seinfeld. It first aired on October 5, 1995. It was the series' 113th episode and third episode for the seventh season. The episode debuted recurring character Jackie Chiles, a lawyer who represents Kramer in the hot coffee case introduced in the previous episode. The title character is played by Mark Metcalf. Elaine dates him while Jerry tries to disprove his claim that there are no houses available to rent in all of Tuscany.

Plot
Concerned for a security guard at Susan's uncle's store who must stand all day, George delivers a rocking chair to the store, using his standing as the owner's soon-to-be nephew to override objections. The guard is so comfortable in the chair that he sleeps through a robbery. Elaine begins dating Bob Cobb, a.k.a. the "Maestro", and immerses herself in classical music.

The Maestro gives Kramer a balm for his coffee burn from the previous episode but Kramer is caught off-guard by how quickly the balm heals his burn. At a meeting with the coffee chain Java World to negotiate an out-of-court settlement, he is so nervous at the possibility that they will ask to see the burn that he eagerly agrees to the settlement as soon as a Java World representative mentions unlimited free coffee, cutting him off before he can finish listing the terms of the offer. This infuriates Kramer's lawyer Jackie Chiles, who realizes that Java World were about to mention monetary compensation.

Jerry is frustrated that Elaine and George have no problem with Bob's insistence on being called "Maestro" instead of his real name; furthermore, the Maestro's unsolicited declaration that there are no houses to rent anywhere in Tuscany makes him suspect Maestro of lying to keep him out of Tuscany. Jerry asks Poppie about the matter. He is referred to Poppie's cousin, who appears to be a mafia boss, making Jerry too afraid to turn down his insistent offer that he rent a house.

Elaine and Maestro are enjoying his house in Tuscany when Jerry and Kramer noisily arrive at the house across the street in a taxi; both Elaine and Maestro react with exasperation.

Production
"The Maestro" was the first appearance of Jackie Chiles, a parody of Johnnie Cochran, played by Phil Morris. Morris and Cochran had visited the same barbershop in Los Angeles for years, and so Morris was very familiar with Cochran's personality and mannerisms. Jerry Seinfeld interrupted Morris' audition for the role by turning up the air conditioning and remarking "You're so funny you're making me sweat." The table reading for "The Maestro" was held on August 27, 1995, and it was filmed before a studio audience on August 30. Michael Richards' mispronunciation of the words "theater" and "caffè latte" was unscripted.

Reception
"The Maestro" first aired on October 5, 1995. The episode earned a ratings share of 22.5/35.

Superman reference

The Maestro's name is Bob Cobb. Bob Cobb is the original alias of Mon-El, a supporting character in Superman comics.

The name Bob Cobb would be used again by Larry David in the Curb Your Enthusiasm episode "Trick or Treat."

References

External links

Seinfeld (season 7) episodes
1995 American television episodes
Television episodes written by Larry David